Kalinga Institute of Industrial Technology (KIIT), formerly KIIT University, is a private deemed university located in Bhubaneswar, Odisha, India. It primarily emphasizes on higher education and research in engineering and science. It offers 34 undergraduate, 32 postgraduate, 10 integrated, 11 Ph.D and 7 postdoctoral research programmes in the fields of science and engineering, medical science, management, law, film and media, humanities and yoga and sports. The admissions for B.Tech. programmes are purely based on merit as per the results in KIITEE exam.

It was founded in 1992 as Industrial Training Institute in Bhubaneswar with a seed revenue of ₹5000 (US$66.8). In 2017 it was renamed back as Kalinga Institute of Industrial Technology following the UGC request to drop "University" from the name for all the institutes granted the status of 'Deemed to be Universities'. It is part of KIIT Society which is estimated to be worth ₹10,000 Crores (US$1.3 billion) as of 2020.

It was declared as deemed university in 2004 by the Ministry of HRD, Government of India and also was conferred with Category A status in 2014 by the Government of India. In 2019 KIIT was recognised as Institute of Eminence by the Ministry of HRD, Government of India. It has been granted Tier-1 accreditation by the National Board of Accreditation. ARIIA 2021 ranked KIIT as India's best private university in innovation and self-financing.

History 
KIIT was established in 1992 as an Industrial Training Institute with only twelve students and two faculty. This institution was the brainchild of Achyuta Samanta, C R Mishra, P K Mishra who had envisioned a profound center of learning in India and so pursued to lay the foundation of KIIT. In 1997, the School of Technology and the School of Computer Application was established. In 2004 it was conferred the status of deemed university and renamed KIIT University.

The KIIT School of Biotechnology, School of Rural Management, School of Medicine and KIIT Law School were started in 2007.

In 2017, the institute was renamed back Kalinga Institute of Industrial Technology, following a request from all institutes deemed to be universities not to use "university" in their title. In 2019, KIIT was recognised as an Institute of Eminence by the Ministry of Human Resource Development (MHRD).

Campus 

Academics 

KIIT has 30,000 students. Each academic program is functioning in different independent campuses.

Accreditation 
KIIT was accredited by National Assessment and Accreditation Council (NAAC) with an A grade with a score of 3.48 out of 4 points. KIIT is a member of Association of Commonwealth Universities (ACU).

Admission
Admission to undergraduate and postgraduate programs are primarily done through the institute's entrance examination KIITEE (KIIT Entrance Examination). Admission to the MTech program are also granted through GATE. Students are wwe admitted to the law school through a written all India common test known as KLSAT (KIIT Law School Admission Test). For the newly introduced courses of fashion, film studies, journalism and sculpturing the admission will be done on the basis of merit of previous qualifying examinations and additional experiences related to the concerned disciplines.

Scholarship
The institute also grants scholarships to meritorious and needy students every year. Among them, Pradyumna Bal Memorial Scholarship is awarded to two economically challenged but meritorious students and they are provided completely free education along with ancillary expenses.

Rankings

Internationally, KIIT  was ranked 401–500 in Asia on the QS World University Rankings of 2023. It was ranked 601–800 in the world by the Times Higher Education World University Rankings of 2023, 201–250 in Asia in 2022 and in the same band among emerging economies.

In India, it was ranked 42nd among engineering colleges by the National Institutional Ranking Framework (NIRF) in 2022, 20th among all universities and 34th overall. NIRF also ranked it 48th in the management ranking, 30th in medical ranking and 11th in law ranking. KIIT ranked 1st in India in the 2020 ARIIA Ranking published by the MHRD under the 'Private or Self-Financed Universities' category. In the NIRF Rankings announced on 11 June 2020, KIIT's rank improved to 44th from 50th in the Overall category, while it was ranked 24th in the rank for University.

Schools

KIIT offers more than 100 programs in the following schools:

KIIT will be one of the first educational institutions in India to have chess as part of the curriculum, with a programme to start in the 2021-22 educational year.

Research
KIIT has a Research and Development wing headed by a director along with other qualified faculty members who collaborate with various Research Organizations. Thrust of the R & D Wing of KIIT is interdisciplinary research through multidisciplinary interactions. The vision is to unleash creative thinking and enable KIIT to become a well-known technological institute for research and development as well as for post-graduate education and doctoral research. Faculty members (spearheaded by Udai P. Singh) are currently pursuing research funded by organizations, such as, the Department of Science and Technology (DST), the Department of Atomic Energy (DAE) and Council of Scientific and Industrial Research (CSIR). Industry Institute interactions are also being strengthened through various funded schemes sponsored by AICTE, UGC and DSIR. In this context, a large number of MoUs have been signed with leading research organizations of the country and abroad for facilitating collaborative research and other academic activities. Currently offered in four broad areas, technology, biotechnology, management and humanities, the college has instituted 48 doctoral fellowships. The R & D wing has been actively supporting various National and International conferences hosted by the institute like International Conference on Emerging Technology and International Conference on Distributed Computing & Internet Technology. The wing actively collaborates with various educational, scientific, research and industrial organizations and has informal collaboration with faculty members of all IITs and corporate houses for specific problem and objectives. It has MoUs with organizations of repute in India and abroad for collaborative action. KIIT has also established a Centre for Innovation and Entrepreneurship to provide technical knowledge and facilities for starting technology driven enterprises as well as doing research for producing cost-effective techniques.

In 2012, the Institution had organized the 99th Indian Science Congress.

Student life 
KIIT provides on-campus residential facilities to its students, research scholars, faculty members and many of its staff. The students live in hostels throughout their stay in the KIIT, though it's optional. There are 20 hostels for boys and 11 hostels for girls are available with accommodation capacity of 10,180 and 5,648 students respectively. About 30% of the hostel rooms are air-conditioned and all the hostels have attached canteens serving good quality food. Each hostel has a 24-hour reading room, a facility for indoor and outdoor games and wireless internet and intranet connectivity. There is a dedicated international hostel that accommodates foreign students.

There are different societies in KIIT to choose from according to the interest and choice of the student. Some of the major societies of the college are Qutopia, the Quiz society; Kronicle, the Literary Society, the Social Responsibility Cell and Korus, the Music Society. Students from Kronicle have made no marks at various National and International Level students. Social Responsibility Cell aims at inculcating a sense of social responsibility in the hearts and minds of all the students. The quiz society Qutopia organizes a national level quiz competition, Udghosh every year. The decenary edition of Udghosh was hosted by Vikram Joshi, winner of World Quizzing Championship. It also conducts an Intra-University Quiz competition "Launchpad" every year as a part of induction program. Qutopia is very well known in quizzing circles throughout the country and has produced quizzers who have not only conquered state and regional level quizzes, but also at national and international level, including the prestigious Tata Crucible Campus Quiz, which is hosted by ace quizmaster Giri Balasubramanium, along with other high-profile quizzes like Debasish Das Memorial (DDM) IT Quiz, Sweden India Nobel Memorial Quiz, and Mahindra AQ.

The KIIT chapter of Society for Promotion of Indian Classical Music And Culture Amongst Youth (SPICMACAY) established in 2003, promotes classical Indian music, dance, and culture among youth and have organised numerous musical concerts. Students can also join National Cadet Corps (NCC) and National Service Scheme (NSS). There are other cultural, literary societies and interest groups. Several schools have their own societies based on the course of the school. The School of Technology, have the Robotic Society, which organizes meetings and workshops to expose the students about robotic concept and how to build and program them. The School of Law have Student Bar Association, which organises moot court competitions and make the students ready for the same. National Cadet Corps (India)|The School of Management have forums based on marketing, HR, Finance and IT clubs which promotes and make the student aware on the latest happenings.

Apart from the societies, which organises Intra School competitions, the institute organizes different cultural and academic fest.  The annual Techno-Management fest named KIIT FEST is organized every year which provides a platform for the progressive brains of our nation to interact, compete and display their creativity and talent. Koncord is the annual cultural fest organized in KIIT. Some of the schools organize their own fest, like the School of Management organizes its own fest Kolosseum every year. Other celebrations include Independence Day, Republic day are organized with great enthusiasm. KIIT International MUN is a Model United Nations Conference organised by the institute.

THE KIIT TBI — Technology Business Incubator is an initiative of KIIT supported by DST, Govt. Of India. It is set up to facilitate and encourage start-ups by providing them with the proper and conducive ecosystem. With more than 10 startups in KIIT TBI, it has a unique mix of pertaining to web 2.0, biotechnology, agriculture, healthcare & legal consulting. Autosports India, the renowned automotive magazine commercial Website is start-up of KIIT undergraduate students of Mechanical Engineering, 2014 batch.

Notable alumni 

KIIT's notable alumni are: 
 Amiya Kumar Mallick, sprinter
 Archita Sahu, actor and model
 Babushan Mohanty, actor and playback singer
 Debapratim Purkayastha, educator
 Dutee Chand, sprinter

References

External links 

 
Universities in Bhubaneswar
Deemed universities in India
Educational institutions established in 1992
1992 establishments in Orissa